Siege of Luxembourg may refer to
 Siege of Luxembourg (1794–95)
 Siege of Luxembourg (1684)